is a private distance learning university with headquarters in Ashibetsu, Hokkaido, Japan, established in 2004. The predecessor of the school was founded in 1985.

External links
 Official website 

Educational institutions established in 1985
Private universities and colleges in Japan
Universities and colleges in Hokkaido
1985 establishments in Japan